The 1966 Football League Cup Final, the sixth Football League Cup final to be staged since the competition's inception, was contested between West Bromwich Albion and West Ham United. It was the last to be played over two legs, with West Brom winning 5–3 on aggregate.

West Ham won the first leg 2–1 at the Boleyn Ground, with West Ham's goals coming from Bobby Moore and Johnny Byrne, with Jeff Astle scoring for West Brom. However, Albion won the second leg 4–1 at The Hawthorns. In the second leg West Brom's goals were scored by Graham Williams, Clive Clark, Tony Brown and John Kaye. Martin Peters with West Ham's consolation.

Match details

First leg

Second leg

Road to The Final
Home teams listed first.

References

League Cup Final
EFL Cup Finals
League Cup Final 1966
League Cup Final 1966
1965–66 Football League
League Cup Final
League Cup Final